Pitton is a racquet sport played by two teams of up to four people with a birdie and a hard pickleball paddle.  It is a combination of pickleball and badminton.

History and development
Pitton originated in the Pacific Northwest. Its origins can be traced to Heatherwood Middle School in the Everett School District. Pitton's name is derived from pickleball and badminton.

Rules
The following information is a simplified summary of the rules of pitton.

Playing court dimensions

The court is rectangular and divided into halves by a net. Courts are usually marked for both singles and doubles play.

The full width of the court is 6.1 meters (20 ft). The full length of the court is 13.4 meters (44 ft). The service courts are marked by a center line dividing the width of the court, by a short service line at a distance of 1.98 meters (6 ft 6 inch) from the net, and by the outer side and back boundaries. In doubles, the service court is also marked by a long service line, which is 0.76 meters (2 ft 6 inch) from the back boundary.
The net is 1.55 meters (5 ft 1 inch) high at the edges and 1.524 meters (5 ft) high in the center. The net posts are placed over the doubles sidelines, even when singles is played.

The minimum height for the ceiling above the court is not mentioned in the Rules of Pitton. Nonetheless, a pitton court will not be suitable if the ceiling is likely to be hit on a high serve.

See also
Badminton
Pickleball
List of racquet sports

References

Racket sports
Badminton
Pickleball